Grazier may refer to:

A person engaged in pastoral farming

People
Margaret Hayes Grazier (1916–1999), an American librarian and educator
Colin Grazier (1920–1942), a Royal Navy sailor
John Grazier (born 1945), an American painter
Kevin Grazier, an American planetary physicist

Publications
The Riverine Grazier (1873–), an Australian agricultural newspaper
The Western Grazier (1880–1951), an Australian agricultural newspaper

See also
Grazer (disambiguation)
Glazier, a glass installation worker
Pastoral (disambiguation)
Pastoralists and Graziers Association of Western Australia